Darren Shaw (born 5 October 1971) is a former Scotland international rugby league footballer, and coach. He has previously coached the Rochdale Hornets.

Before his coaching career, Shaw played for a number of clubs in England and Australia.  Shaw played for Brisbane Broncos, London Broncos, Sheffield Eagles, Castleford Tigers (Heritage No. 766), Salford City Reds, Oldham RLFC (Heritage No. 1139) and Rochdale Hornets.

He played  in Sheffield Eagles' 17–8 victory over Wigan in the 1998 Challenge Cup Final during Super League III at Wembley Stadium, London on Saturday 2 May 1998.

Darren Shaw was assistant coach to Bobbie Goulding at Rochdale Hornets prior to taking charge at Leigh in 2006. Shaw replaced Tony Benson after Benson was relieved of his duties following a shock play-off defeat by Batley Bulldogs.

Shortly after Shaw's appointment it was found that he did not have the relevant coaching qualifications to take charge of a team at National Leagues level.  To counter this, Shaw was made Football Manager, with Paul Rowley becoming First Team coach.

Darren Shaw's first full season in charge of Leigh Centurions ended with a 19–6 play off defeat away to Whitehaven.  Leigh's 2007 season was one dogged by inconsistency.  Convincing wins were often followed by heavy defeats as Shaw was forced to field a number of youngsters due to injury problems.  The unsettled nature of the side in 2007 was reflected by the fact that Shaw gave débuts to over 20 players over the course of the season.

Despite the disappointing end to the 2007 season, Shaw was given a contract to coach Leigh for the 2008 season.

After a promising start to the 2008 season, Shaw tendered his resignation following defeats by Salford, Widnes and Featherstone Rovers.

He was appointed as head coach of Rochdale Hornets in May 2008.

Challenge Cup Final appearances
Dale Laughton played right-, i.e. number 12, in Sheffield Eagles' 17–8 victory over Wigan in the 1998 Challenge Cup Final during Super League III at Wembley Stadium, London on Saturday 2 May 1998.

References

External links
 Statistics at rugbyleagueproject.org

1971 births
Living people
Australian people of Scottish descent
Australian rugby league coaches
Australian rugby league players
Canberra Raiders players
Castleford Tigers players
Leigh Leopards coaches
London Broncos players
Oldham R.L.F.C. players
Rochdale Hornets coaches
Rochdale Hornets players
Rugby articles needing expert attention
Rugby league second-rows
Salford Red Devils players
Scotland national rugby league team captains
Scotland national rugby league team players
Sheffield Eagles (1984) players